Tiaquin Demesne is a townland in the parish of Athenry, County Galway. The Irish form is Tigh Dachoine, which literally translates as "St. Dachonna’s house".

References

Townlands of County Galway